Outreach Offshore Ltd is a supplier of hydraulic cranes, lifting and access equipment. The company was founded in 1990 and its headquarters are in Falkirk, Scotland. Formerly a division of Outreach Ltd, Outreach Offshore continued after the formal disbanding of the parent company in May 2018.

History 
Formed in 1990 from the Engineering Division of James Jones & Sons in Larbert, Outreach Ltd continued the partnership with Palfinger which started in 1976. It is the Scottish supplier for Palfinger and the UK supplier for Palfinger Epsilon.

Outreach Access was launched in 2011, offering a range of truck, van, specialist mounted access platforms, scissors and booms.

On 31 July 2014, Outreach Ltd acquired Norfolk-based Tech Safe Systems Ltd, specialists in the design, engineering and manufacture of LARS, Control Cabins and Workshops for ROVs, used most commonly in deep water industries such as oil and gas and offshore renewables.

In May 2018 Outreach Ltd disbanded and Outreach Offshore Ltd was created. The Outreach Truck element of Outreach Ltd was acquired by T H WHITE Ltd as part of its lorry cranes division, which was rebranded as Palfinger UK.

outreach Ltd scope 
Outreach Ltd operated both nationally and, for some of its products, internationally. It is involved in a wide range of industry sectors such as:

 Offshore Oil and Gas
 Marine
 Renewable Energy
 Construction
 Transport and Distribution
 Timber
 Waste Management and Recycling
 Emergency Services
 Local Authorities and Roads
 General Industrial

Products 
Outreach Ltd supplied and installed a range of products manufactured by Palfinger and Palfinger Marine. Outreach Ltd are the Scottish suppliers of the Palfinger products including:
 Knuckle-boom Cranes
 Epsilon Timber and Recycling Cranes
 Hook and Skip Loaders
 Marine Cranes
 Offshore Cranes
 Davit Systems
 Boats
Outreach Ltd was a dealer and importer for Alucar Oy Timber Bunks and Superstructures with whom it has worked for 30 years.

Training 
Outreach Ltd provided training courses including:
 International Powered Access Federation (IPAF)
 Association of Lorry Loader Manufacturer's and Importers Training (ALLMI)
 Prefabricated Access Suppliers and Manufacturers Association Training (PASMA)

References 

Business services companies of Scotland
Business services companies established in 1990
Companies based in Falkirk (council area)
1990 establishments in Scotland